Vikram Vetal is a 1986 Indian Hindi-language fantasy film directed by Shantilal Soni, starring Vikram Gokhale, Manhar Desai, Deepika Chikhalia and Satish Shah. It is based on the Baital Pachisi, a collection of Indian fairy tales and legends about King Vikramaditya and the Vetala.

Soundtrack
"Tera Badan Tera Yauvan" - Shabbir Kumar

References

External links
 

1986 films
Films scored by Nadeem–Shravan
1980s Hindi-language films
Indian fantasy films
Memorials to Vikramaditya
Indian vampire films
Indian ghost films
Hindu mythological films